Landstede Hammers is a Dutch basketball club based in Zwolle. The club plays in the BNXT League, the Dutch top tier division. The club was founded as Cees Lubbers The Hammers in 1995. In 1999, the club’s name was changed into Landstede Hammers. In 2001, the club received its current name Landstede Basketbal as the team became part of the same-named educational institution in Zwolle. The home games of the club are played in the Landstede Sportcentrum.

In its existence, Landstede won the DBL championship one time in 2019. In 2017, the club captured its first trophy when it won the Dutch Supercup.

History
The club was founded as Cees Lubbers/The Hammers and was based in Meppel in the first season of the club. The club played with the license of Red Giants Meppel, and moved to Zwolle, partly because arena 'Het Vledder' in Meppel didn't meet requirements. After a short time Landstede became the main sponsor of the club, that was named Landstede Hammers and later Landstede Basketbal. In the 2004–05 season Landstede reached the Dutch Finals for the first time in club history. It lost 4–0 to Amsterdam. In 2010 the club got a new arena in the Landstede Sportcentrum.

In 2017, Landstede won its first trophy in team history by winning the Dutch Supercup over Donar, winning 77–69.

In the 2018–19 season, Landstede finished in the second place in the regular season. The team had a 28–6 record in the regular season, and had All-DBL Team performers Noah Dahlman and Kaza Kajami-Keane on its roster. In the playoffs, Landstede defeated New Heroes Den Bosch 1–3 in the semi-finals. In the finals, Landstede beat defending champions Donar to win its first domestic championship.

On 22 September 2019, Hammers won its second Supercup trophy after beating ZZ Leiden 78–66 in its home arena. In the 2019–20 season, Landstede played in the FIBA Europe Cup, which marked the club's first European appearance in 19 years. On 19 August 2019, the club announced they returned to the name Landstede Hammers. In its first FIBA Europe Cup season, Landstede advanced past the regular season before losing six straight games in the second round.

Since the 2021–22 season, Hammers plays in the BNXT League, in which the national leagues of Belgium and the Netherlands have been merged.

Logos and names

When founded, the club was named Cees Lubbers The Hammers, named after main sponsor Cees Lubbers. The name Hammers stayed with the team through its supporters, who used its nickname for the following years. From 1996, the team was known as Landstede Hammers after new sponsor Landstede. In 1999, the club was named Landstede Basketbal, a name they kept for 20 years. On 19 August 2019, the club announced they returned to the name Landstede Hammers.

Honours

Domestic competitions
Dutch Basketball League
Winners (1): 2018–19
Runners-up (3): 2004–05, 2015–16, 2016–17
Dutch Cup
Runners-up (4): 2004–05, 2012–13, 2016–17, 2018–19
Dutch Supercup
Winners (2): 2017, 2019

Friendly competitions
Basketball Days
Winners (2): 2011, 2012

Players

Retired numbers

Current roster

Depth chart

Notable players

Individual awards

DBL Play-offs MVP
Kaza Kajami-Keane – 2019
All-DBL Team
Greg Stevenson – 2005
Darnell Hinson – 2006
Zack Novak – 2013
Joe Burton – 2015
Grant Gibbs – 2016
Tyson Hinz – 2016
J.T. Tiller – 2017
Clayton Vette – 2017
Noah Dahlman – 2018, 2019
Kaza Kajami-Keane – 2019

DBL Coach of the Year
Herman van den Belt – 2002, 2005, 2016
DBL Defensive Player of the Year
J.T. Tiller – 2017
DBL Rookie of the Year
Freek Vos – 2016
Olaf Schaftenaar – 2017
DBL MVP Under 23
Leon Williams – 2012
DBL Most Improved Player
Grant Gibbs – 2016
DBL Statistical Player of the Year
Joe Burton – 2015

Club records
Bold denotes still active with team. As of 14 April 2021:

European record

Notes

Arenas

Season by season

Head coaches
The Hammers have had four different head coaches in their history, with Herman van den Belt coaching the team the most seasons.

References

External links

Official site 
Landstede Basketbal fan site 
Eurobasket.com Landstede Page

 
Dutch Basketball League teams
Basketball teams in the Netherlands
Basketball teams established in 1991
1991 establishments in the Netherlands
Sports clubs in Zwolle